S. M. Siddaiah (1918–2011) was an Indian politician who was a Member of the Indian National Congress and held many posts in the Union Government and MP for the Chamarajanagar constituency  from 1957 to 1977. (Chamarajanagar seat was a part of Mysore seat before 1967) Siddaiah died in 2011.

References

1918 births
2011 deaths
Indian National Congress politicians from Karnataka
People from Chamarajanagar district
India MPs 1957–1962
India MPs 1962–1967
India MPs 1967–1970
Lok Sabha members from Karnataka